Astra (Latin for "stars") may refer to:

People
 Astra (name)

Places
 Astra, Chubut, a village in Argentina
 Astra (Isauria), a town of ancient Isauria, now in Turkey
 Astra, one suggested name for a hypothetical fifth planet that became the asteroid belt

Entertainment
 Astra (Marvel Comics), the name of two otherwise unrelated Marvel Comics characters from 1977 and 1999, respectively
 Astra (DC Comics)
 Astra (film), a 2012 Bengali film
 Australian Subscription Television and Radio Association
 ASTRA Awards, annual awards presented by the Australian subscription television industry
 Astra, a character in the TV series Ultraman Leo

Music
 Astra Chamber Music Society, a Melbourne, Australia concert organization, formed in 1951
 Astra (band), an American psychedelic and progressive rock band
 Astra (album), a 1985 release by Asia
 Astra, a 1990 composition by Charles Wuorinen

Sports
 FC Astra Giurgiu, a Romanian football club, currently playing in Liga I
 Astra Krotoszyn, a Polish sports club
 Astra Giurgiu, a Romanian sports club

Software
 Trillian Astra, a codename for a version of Trillian instant messaging (IM) client
 Astra (software), software to organize digital broadcasting services for TV operators and broadcasters, etc.

Transportation

Automobiles
 Astra (1920 automobile), built by American company Dorris Motors
 Astra (1922 automobile), French cyclecar made by E Pasquet
 Astra (1930 automobile), shown by Belgian company Automobiles Astra, but never produced
 Astra (1954 automobile), built by British Anzani until 1959
 Astra Veicoli Industriali, Italian truck manufacturer, a subsidiary of IVECO
 Astra Bus, a bus manufacturer based in Romania
 Vauxhall Astra, British GM brand since 1979, originally a version of the Opel Kadett
 Holden Astra, Australian version of the Nissan Pulsar, 1984–1989; version of the Opel Astra since 1995
 Opel Astra, produced since 1991; also known as the Chevrolet Astra and Saturn Astra

Aviation
 IAI Astra, Israel Aircraft Industries-manufactured twin-engine business jet
 A Handley Page Hinaidi prototype, later used for barnstorming in England under the name Astra
 Stellar Astra, American ultralight trike design
 Ultralight Engineering Astra, ultralight aircraft
 Société Astra, French airship and aeroplane manufacturer
 Astra Airlines, an airline based in Thessaloniki, Greece

Rail
 Astra Rail Industries, a Romanian rail vehicle manufacturer
 Astra Vagoane Călători, a passenger rail and tram cars manufacturer in Arad, Romania

Spaceflight
 Association in Scotland to Research into Astronautics, a Scottish space advocacy group
 Astra (American spaceflight company), a US launch service provider with its rocket Astra
 ASTRA program, a German future launcher technology research program from 1995 to 2005
 SES Astra, a subsidiary of SES that owns and operates communications satellites
 Astra (satellite), a family of satellites operated by SES S.A. through SES Astra

Military and weaponry
 Astra (weapon), a supernatural weapon in Hindu mythology
 Astra (missile)
 Astra-Unceta y Cia SA Spanish weapons manufacturer

Other uses
 Astra (beer)
 Astra (horse)
 Astra AB, former international pharmaceutical company based in Sweden
 Astra International, Indonesian conglomerate
 ASTRA (reactor), Adaptierter Schwimmbecken-Typ-Reaktor Austria, a type of nuclear reactor
 American Specialty Toy Retailing Association
 Transylvanian Association for Romanian Literature and the Culture of the Romanian People (abbreviated as ASTRA in Romanian), a Romanian Transylvanian cultural association
 ASTRA, a branch of Altrusa International, Inc

See also

 
 Ad astra (disambiguation), a Latin phrase meaning "to the stars"
 Astro (disambiguation)